Animal Rights Cambridge is an animal rights group based in Cambridge, England, founded in 1978. The group claims to be the longest standing local animal rights group in the UK.

Animal Rights Cambridge opposes all forms of animal exploitation. The group have been involved in protests against foie gras and animal testing.

References

External links
 

Organizations established in 1978
Organisations based in Cambridge
Animal rights organizations
Animal welfare organisations based in the United Kingdom
1978 establishments in the United Kingdom